Jholung or Jholong (misspelt as Jhalong or Jhalung) is a village in the Gorubathan CD block in the Kalimpong subdivision of the Kalimpong district in West Bengal, India.

Geography

Location

Area overview
The map alongside shows the Kalimpong Sadar subdivision of Kalimpong district. This region is characterized by abruptly rising hills and numerous small streams. It is a predominantly rural area with 77.67% of the population living in rural areas and only 22.23% living in the urban areas. While Kalimpong is the only municipality, Dungra is the sole census town in the entire area. The economy is agro-based and there are 6 tea gardens in the Gorubathan CD block. In 2011, Kalimpong subdivision had a literacy rate of 81.85%, comparable with the highest levels of literacy in the districts of the state. While the first degree college in the subdivision was established at Kalimpong in 1962 the entire subdivision (and now the entire district), other than the head-quarters, had to wait till as late as 2015 (more than half a century) to have their first degree colleges at Pedong and Gorubathan.

Note: The map alongside presents some of the notable locations in the subdivision. All places marked in the map are linked in the larger full screen map.

The place
This tourist spot is 99 km from Siliguri and 77 km from Jalpaiguri. Surrounded by the thickly wooded forest and the astounding hills of Bhutan in the backdrop, Jhalong is undoubtedly a paradise for nature lovers.

The hill station is situated near the Indo-Bhutan border on the banks of the Jaldhaka River, on the way to Bindu. Jaldhaka Hydro Electricity Project on the Jaldhaka River is a major attraction in this area. Bird lovers can enjoy a varied collection of hill birds as well as migratory water fowl here.

Accommodation

There is a private hotel for tourists in Jholung. A government forest bungalow also provides accommodation.

References

Villages in Kalimpong district